Gateshead Talmudical College, popularly known as Gateshead Yeshiva, is located in the Bensham area of Gateshead in North East England. It is the largest yeshiva in Europe and considered to be one of the most prestigious advanced yeshivas in the Orthodox world. The student body currently (as of 2019) numbers approx. 350. Although students are mainly British, there are European, American, Canadians as well as some from South America, Australia and South Africa.

History
The yeshiva was founded in Gateshead in 1929 by Reb Dovid Dryan, with the Chofetz Chaim serving as an active patron and appointing the original head of the yeshiva. The first rosh yeshiva and menahel (principal) were respectively Rabbi Nachman Landinski and Rabbi Eliezer Kahan, both alumni of the famed Novardok yeshiva network and both of whom had escaped Communist Russia religious persecution by escaping across the border from Russia to Poland. Originally, Rabbi Avraham Sacharov was designated as first rosh yeshiva, but Chief Rabbi Joseph Hertz asked William Joynson Hicks, the Home Secretary, to block Sacharov's immigration in an attempt to prevent the establishment of a yeshiva outside his jurisdiction. The attempt failed and Landynski, Sacharov's brother-in-law, was appointed instead. At its inception, Gateshead Yeshiva was seen as a branch of Novardok, officially sharing its doctrines, ideals and methodology and named "Yeshivas Beis Yosef" in common with other branches of Novardok.

By 1948, an official American fundraising (including registration as a domestic not-for-profit corporation) was established. (501(C)3)

As of 2019, the Yeshiva has government accreditation, and the lunchroom has been rated "5 (Very Good)" for Food Hygiene.

Notable faculty
Roshei yeshiva:
 1929-1951: Rabbi Nachman Dovid Landinski, an alumnus of Radin, Eishyshok, Kelm, Mir, Łomża, Suvalk and Novardok yeshivas
 1947-1979: Rabbi Leib Lopian, son of Rabbi Elyah Lopian, an alumnus of Telz yeshiva
 1947-1982: Rabbi Leib Gurwicz, an alumnus of Mir, Baranovitch and Brisk yeshivas
 1984-: Rosh Yeshiva: Rabbi Avrohom Gurwicz, an alumnus of Brisk yeshiva, and a past student

Mashgichim:
 Rabbi Moshe Schwab
 Rabbi Matisyohu Salomon, now mashgiach at Lakewood Yeshiva

Notable alumni
Over its 82-year history, Gateshead Yeshiva has produced thousands of alumni, among them prominent rabbis.
 Dayan Chanoch Ehrentreu, (head dayan of London Beth Din)
Louis Jacobs CBE (founder of the Masorti Judaism)
 Dayan Berel Berkovits zt'l (Dayan of the Federation of Synagogues)
 Rabbi Boruch Horovitz, (Rosh Yeshiva of Dvar Yerushalayim)
 Rabbi Yaakov Moshe Hillel, (Rosh Yeshiva of Ahavat Shalom)
 Rav Yitzchok Tuvia Weiss (Gaavad, Edah HaChareidis, Jerusalem)
 Professor Paul W. Franks (professor of Jewish Philosophy, Yale University)
 Dayan Casriel Dovid Kaplin (dayan of London Beth Din)
 Rabbi Dr. Nathan Lopes Cardozo (founder and Dean of the David Cardozo Academy)
 Rabbi Pini Dunner (Senior Rabbi at Beverly Hills Synagogue, California, USA)
 Rabbi Daniel Lapin
 Professor Ze'ev Lev (founder of the Jerusalem College of Technology)
 Rabbi Jonathan Rietti (lecturer at Gateways)
 Dayan Yehuda Refson (Chief religious judge Leeds, England)

Gateshead Seminary
 Omer Yankelevich, Israeli Member of Parliament, alumna of the Gateshead seminary for women

Hashkafa 
The yeshiva was originally established as a branch of the Novardok network of yeshivas then existing in Eastern Europe. The primary focal point of Novahrdock hashkafa is extreme reliance on Divine providence and commitment to achieving spiritual goals without feeling encumbered by physical and material constraints.

Buildings and structure
When Rabbi Landinski arrived in Gateshead he began to teach in the 'Blechenner Shul', a tin shed synagogue, which in 1939 was replaced with the current Gateshead community synagogue.

The original building procured by the yeshiva was at 179 Bewick Road. As the yeshiva expanded it acquired neighbouring properties in Rectory Road and 177 Bewick Road. In 1961 a new building was erected at 88 Windermere Street to house a new beth hamedresh (the hall used for study and prayer), with the dining room on the floor below and the kitchens in the basement. The old beth hamedrash building at 179 Bewick Road and neighbouring houses in Rectory Road were demolished to make way for a new two-storey dormitory block, Clore House, which was opened in 1963, forming the beginnings of the yeshiva campus. A later three-storey building further up Bewick Road joined the first dormitory block, and attached the yeshiva dormitories with the back of the study hall via a bridge. Later on, in 1992, a new building, Sebba House was built, which consisted of a state-of-the-art dormitory building for about 70 students. Later, in 1997 a new building, Tiferes Yonasan, was erected, which attached the study hall further down Windermere Street to the dormitories and extended the main building, including the study hall and the dining room. The last extension on the right hand side added more lecture halls. In addition these extensions created a courtyard leading on from the back alley, from Rydal Street.

Gateshead Foundation for Torah
The Gateshead Foundation for Torah was established in 1966 "to further the publication of Jewish literature." Among the works they've published are:
 Sefer Roshei she'arim
 Sabbath Shiurim: 5729
 Sabbath Shiurim: 5739

Jewish Teachers' Training College, Gateshead 
Jewish Teachers' Training College, Gateshead (also known as Beth Midrash Lemoroth), is a school whose students were described by The New York Times as "teen-age girls." Like the schools for men, it is located on Bewick Road. It was founded by Avraham Dov Kohn in 1944, then headed by Mordechai Miller (1921-2001) and subsequently run by Kohn's son Simcha Kohn. In 2019 they began expanding their building behind their Bewick Road facility.

The course, which runs for three years, has been described as largely staffed by experienced rabbis. The vision
for this school was described by Miller's son as coming from Eliyahu Eliezer Dessler.

See also
Shraga Feivel Zimmerman

References

Sources
 Gateshead: Its community, Its personalities, Its Institutions by Miriam Dansky (1992),  is a unique history of the Gateshead Jewish community and in particular its famous yeshiva.
 Gateshead Book of Days by Jo Bath, Richard F. Stevenson (2013),

External links
 Alumni association official web site

 History of the Gateshead Yeshiva
 UK, Full Inspection Report for Beth Midrash Lemoroth / Jewish Teachers Training College

Haredi yeshivas
Judaism in England
Orthodox yeshivas in the United Kingdom
Educational institutions established in 1929
Haredi Judaism in the United Kingdom
Novardok Yeshiva
1929 establishments in England